Kattakudi   is a village in the Annavasalrevenue block of Pudukkottai district, Tamil Nadu, India.

Demographics 

As per the 2001 census, Kattakudi  had a total population of 2250 with 1074 males and 1176 females. Out of the total population 1072    people were literate.

References

    

Villages in Pudukkottai district